Bill MacDonald (7 March 1906 – 24 July 1973) was a former Australian rules footballer who played with Melbourne in the Victorian Football League (VFL).

MacDonald played in back to back premierships for the Colts Football Club in the Deniliquin Football Association in 1925 and 1926, prior to playing with Stawell.

MacDonald was also an accomplished runner who finished 3rd in the 1925 Stawell Gift. MacDonald was favorite for the 1928 Stawell Gift, but was beaten in his semi final. He also won the 1924 Stratford Gift and 1928 Horsham Gift.

Notes

External links 

1906 births
Australian rules footballers from Victoria (Australia)
Melbourne Football Club players
1973 deaths